Greg Byrne, K.C. (born April 14, 1960, in Harvey, New Brunswick) is a lawyer and former MLA in the province of New Brunswick, Canada.

Byrne was educated at Fredericton High School, Saint Thomas University (where he received a Bachelor of Arts in 1984) and the University of New Brunswick (where he received a Bachelor of Laws in 1987).

A Liberal, he was elected to the Legislative Assembly of New Brunswick in the 1995 provincial election. He joined the cabinet of Frank McKenna in 1997 as Minister responsible for Mines and Energy.

He resigned from cabinet in 1998 in order to run in the leadership convention to replace McKenna who had resigned later in 1997. Byrne finished second to Camille Thériault at the convention. Thériault named Byrne to his cabinet in the roles of Minister of Justice and Attorney General of New Brunswick, and Government House Leader.

A member of the Provincial Cabinet’s Board of Management and Priorities & Planning committees, he also sat on the Legislative Administration Committee, the Select Committee on Energy and served as Chairman of both the Law Amendments Committee and the Select Committee on Gasoline Pricing.

Like many of his Liberal colleagues, Byrne fell victim to the Progressive Conservative sweep in the 1999 election, losing his seat by only 264 votes.

In 2002, he co-chaired the successful leadership bid of Shawn Graham to succeed Thériault.

In 2003, he was elected president of the New Brunswick Liberals and he was re-elected in 2005. Byrne ran and won the riding of Fredericton-Lincoln running as a Liberal candidate in the 2006 election. Following the election, he stepped down as president of the party and was returned to the cabinet as Minister of Business New Brunswick. Minister Responsible for Population Growth, Minister Responsible for Service New Brunswick, Minister Responsible for Red Tape Reduction, and Minister Responsible for Communications New Brunswick.

He was subsequently appointed Minister of Finance, Minister Responsible for the New Brunswick Liquor Corporation, Minister Responsible for the Lotteries and Gaming Commission and Minister Responsible for the New Brunswick Investment Management Corporation.

Byrne failed to regain his seat in the general election of 2010, when the Graham government was defeated by David Alward and the Progressive Conservative Party.

He served as also Chief of Staff in the Office of the Official Opposition and Chief of Staff/Principal Secretary in the Office of the Premier. He is the President and CEO of Clonmore Associates.

Sources
 Cache of Byrne's bio from the New Brunswick Legislaturehttps://ca.linkedin.com/in/greg-byrne-q-c-5a48b19 https://www.aims.ca/site/media/aims/EventByrneBio.pdf  https://www.facebook.com/gregbyrneNB/about_work_and_education    https://globalnews.ca/news/7284375/new-brunswick-election-oromocto-lincoln-fredericton-2020/  https://www.voixfemmesnb-voiceswomennb.ca/content/dam/gnb/Departments/petl-epft/PDF/PopGrowth/Strategy-e.pdf  https://www.stu.ca/alumni/alumni-awards/alumni-association-award-for-service/2017/  https://ca.linkedin.com/in/greg-byrne-q-c-5a48b19

External links
 Greg Byrne Official Website

1960 births
Lawyers in New Brunswick
Living people
University of New Brunswick alumni
New Brunswick Liberal Association MLAs
Members of the Executive Council of New Brunswick
St. Thomas University (New Brunswick) alumni
University of New Brunswick Faculty of Law alumni
21st-century Canadian politicians